The flora of Madhya Pradesh province in India, is very rich and diverse. Central, eastern and southern parts of the state are forested, whereas northern and western parts are deficient in forest. Variability in climatic and edaphic conditions brings about significant difference in the forest types and flora of the state. There are four important forest types: tropical moist, tropical dry, tropical thorn, and subtropical broadleaved hill forests. Based on composition, there are three important forest formations namely teak forest, sal forest and miscellaneous Forests. Bamboo bearing areas are widely distributed in the state. 
Following is the list of trees and plants found in Madhya Pradesh:

Large trees

Small trees

Shrubs and undershrubs

Climbers

Grasses

Other plants

Gallery

See also 
Flora of the Indian epic period

References 
K.P.Sagreiya and Balwant Singh:Botanical and Standardised Hindi Names of Important and Common Forest Plants of Madhya Pradesh, Gwalior Government Regional Press, 1958.

 
Environment of Madhya Pradesh
Madhya Pradesh-related lists
Madhya Pradesh